The Houston Exchange Clubs Classic was a golf tournament on the LPGA Tour from 1977 to 1978. It was played at the Newport Yacht & Country Club (now Newport Country Club) in Crosby, Texas.

Winners
1978 Donna Caponi
1977 Amy Alcott

References

Former LPGA Tour events
Golf in Texas
1977 establishments in Texas
1978 disestablishments in Texas
Recurring sporting events established in 1977
Recurring sporting events disestablished in 1978
Sports in Harris County, Texas
Women's sports in Texas